Kirill Leonidovich Khaliavin (born 21 November 1990) is a Russian-Spanish retired ice dancer. Emerging on the international scene competing for Russia with Ksenia Monko, his future wife, Khaliavin became the 2011 World Junior champion, a two-time (2009, 2010) Junior Grand Prix Final champion, and the 2015 Russian national silver medalist.

Following Monko's retirement, Khaliavin formed a new partnership with Spanish ice dancer Sara Hurtado. With Hurtado he was the 2018 Rostelecom Cup silver medalist and 2017 & 2019 Spanish national champion. The two placed twelfth at the 2018 Winter Olympics and were the first Spanish ice dancers to stand on a Grand Prix podium.

Personal life 
Kirill Leonidovich Khaliavin was born 21 November 1990 in Kirov, Kirov Oblast. He married Ksenia Monko in Moscow in late May 2017. He became a Spanish citizen in July 2017. Monko and Khaliavin's son was born in October 2020. The couple now reside in Madrid, Spain.

Career

Early years 
Khaliavin started skating in 1994. He began learning ice dancing when he was eight years old. His first coach was Tatiana Kurakina.

2000 to 2009: Early years of Monko/Khaliavin 

Khaliavin teamed up with Monko in 2000. The two debuted on the ISU Junior Grand Prix series in 2006, placing eleventh in Norway. They trained in Kirov before problems with ice time led them to move to Rostov in 2005. They relocated with their coach to Moscow in May 2009.

2009–2010 season: First JGP Final title 
Monko/Khaliavin won the Junior Grand Prix Final and the Russian Junior title. They took the bronze at the 2010 World Junior Championships.

2010–2011 season: World Junior title 
Monko/Khaliavin won their second JGP Final title, and followed that up with their second Russian Junior title. They won gold at the 2011 World Junior Championships.

2011–2012 season: Senior debut 
Monko/Khaliavin moved up to the senior level for the 2011–12 season. They were assigned to compete at 2011 Skate America and 2011 Cup of China as their Grand Prix events but Khaliavin fell ill with mononucleosis in September. They withdrew from both Grand Prix events but returned to competition at the Russian Championships where they finished fifth.

In February 2012, Monko/Khaliavin switched coaches to Alexander Zhulin and Oleg Volkov.

2012–2013 season 
Monko/Khaliavin finished sixth at the 2012 Rostelecom Cup and fourth at the 2013 Russian Championships. They joined the Russian team to the 2013 World Team Trophy, replacing Ekaterina Bobrova / Dmitri Soloviev who withdrew due to injury. Monko/Khaliavin finished third at the event and Team Russia finished fourth overall. The duo withdrew from the exhibitions after Khaliavin developed an infection resulting in a high fever.

2013–2014 season 
Monko/Khaliavin won silver at the 2013 Nebelhorn Trophy, behind Americans Madison Hubbell / Zachary Donohue, and then bronze at the 2013 International Cup of Nice. Their Grand Prix results were sixth at the 2013 Trophée Eric Bompard and fifth at the 2013 Rostelecom Cup. After placing fifth at the 2014 Russian Championships, they were not selected for the Olympics.

2014–2015 season 
Monko and Khaliavin placed fourth at 2014 Skate Canada International and second at 2014 NHK Trophy. They went on to place second at the 2015 Russian Figure Skating Championships. They finished tenth at the 2015 European Championships and 8th at the 2015 World Championships.

2015–2016 season: Monko/Khaliavin end partnership 
Monko/Khaliavin started their season by finishing fourth at the 2015 Skate Canada International. They withdrew from their second Grand Prix assignment, the 2015 Rostelecom Cup, due to Monko's injury. In 2016, she retired from competition due to the injury.

2016–2017 season: Debut of Hurtado/Khaliavin 
Khaliavin and Spain's Sara Hurtado began considering skating together in late December 2015 and had a tryout in March 2016 in Moscow. He was released to skate for Spain in September 2016. They decided to be coached by Alexander Zhulin in Moscow. Making their international debut, they won gold at the Santa Claus Cup, held in December 2016 in Hungary. Later in the month, they won the Spanish national title ahead of Olivia Smart / Adrià Díaz.

Hurtado/Khaliavin finished thirteenth at the 2017 European Championships in Ostrava, Czech Republic. It was their final competition of the season. The Federación Española Deportes de Hielo (FEDH) selected Smart/Díaz to compete at the 2017 World Championships.

2017–2018 season: Winter Olympics 
In July 2017, FEDH announced that Spain's Olympic spot in ice dancing would go to the team which received the highest combined score at the 2017 CS Golden Spin of Zagreb and Spanish Championships.

Hurtado/Khaliavin began their season in October with a sixth-place result at the 2017 CS Finlandia Trophy. The following month, they won gold at the Open d'Andorra. In December, they finished fourth at the 2017 CS Golden Spin of Zagreb, just 0.30 points behind bronze medalists Kaitlin Hawayek / Jean-Luc Baker of the United States. They outscored Smart/Díaz by 4.18 points at Golden Spin and finished second at the Spanish Championships with a 3.23 deficit, resulting in a final advantage of 0.95 points. On 17 December 2017, FEDH confirmed that Hurtado/Khaliavin would compete at the Olympics.

In January, Hurtado/Khaliavin placed seventh in the short dance, tenth in the free dance, and eighth overall at the 2018 European Championships in Moscow. In February, they competed at the 2018 Winter Olympics in Pyeongchang, South Korea. Ranked twelfth in the short and eleventh in the free, the two finished twelfth overall.

The Spanish Federation had decided to send Olivia Smart and Adria Diaz to the World Championships and so Hurtado and Khaliavin got an early start to the upcoming season. However, before that, they went to Spain and met King Felipe VI and Queen Letizia, who invited all the Winter Olympians from PyeongChang.

2018–2019 season: First Grand Prix medal 
Hurtado/Khaliavin began their season with bronze at the 2018 CS Lombardia Trophy in September. The following month, making their Grand Prix debut, they placed fourth at the 2018 Grand Prix of Helsinki and then won silver at the 2018 Rostelecom Cup, becoming the first Spanish ice dancers to stand on a Grand Prix podium.  Hurtado called the occasion "a goal and I dreamed of it when I saw Javier getting on the podium. It proves to skaters in Spain that you can be here when you work hard."

After winning their second Spanish national title, Hurtado/Khaliavin competed at the 2019 European Championships, placing seventh, almost four points ahead of Smart/Díaz. They were consequently assigned to Spain's lone dance spot for the 2019 World Championships, where they placed twelfth.

2019–2020 season 
Beginning the season on the Challenger series at the 2019 CS Ondrej Nepela Memorial, Hurtado/Khaliavin took the silver medal.  They next won gold at the 2019 CS Ice Star.  At their first Grand Prix assignment, the 2019 Skate Canada International, they placed fifth.  Weeks later at the 2019 Rostelecom Cup, they placed third in the rhythm dance.  Hurtado said there was still "some little things in the technical aspect of the program" to fix, but that they felt the program was improving.  Third in the free dance as well, they won their second Grand Prix medal.

After winning the silver medal at the Spanish championships, Hurtado/Khaliavin placed seventh at the 2020 European Championships, finishing ahead of Smart/Díaz.  The latter were nevertheless assigned to the 2020 World Championships in Montreal, though these were subsequently cancelled as a result of the coronavirus pandemic.

2020–2021 season 
Hurtado suffered a shoulder injury in the summer of 2020 that required her to return to Spain for surgery, with a projected recovery time of six months. On December 1, Khaliavin indicated that they had reunited and resumed training.

While Smart/Díaz were listed on the preliminary entry list for the 2021 World Championships, the Spanish Ice Sports Federation announced on March 2 that the final determination as to which team would represent Spain would be made following a virtual skate-off between them and Hurtado/Khaliavin.  On March 7, the Spanish federation announced that the berth had been awarded to Hurtado/Khaliavin. They placed eleventh in Stockholm. This qualified one place for a Spanish dance team at the 2022 Winter Olympics.

2021–2022 season: Final season and retirement 
Hurtado/Khaliavin began the season at the 2021 CS Lombardia Trophy, winning the bronze medal. They next competed at the 2021 CS Finlandia Trophy, the first of three matchups with Smart/Díaz to determine who would be named to the Spanish Olympic team. They were third in the rhythm dance, ahead of Smart/Díaz, but due to free dance errors finished in fifth place, 0.25 points behind their rivals in fourth.

At their first Grand Prix assignment, the 2021 NHK Trophy, Hurtado/Khaliavin placed fourth in the rhythm dance, 0.03 points behind third-place Britons Fear/Gibson. In the free dance, Khaliavin struggled to stabilize their curve lift, and they lost a level on their closing rotational lift, as a result of which they were fifth in that segment, but remained narrowly in fourth overall, 0.71 points ahead of the Canadian team Lajoie/Lagha. At the 2021 Rostelecom Cup, Hurtado/Khaliavin were fourth in both programs, again finishing fourth overall.

Hurtado/Khaliavin faced off against Smart/Díaz at the 2022 Spanish Championships, and finished second in both segments of the competition with a score of 191.90, 8.12 points behind their gold medalist rivals, widening their cumulative deficit to 8.37 points. Both teams then went to the 2022 European Championships, the third and final competition for the Spanish Olympic berth. Hurtado/Khaliavin were sixth in both segments for sixth overall. Khaliavin called their performance "the best we have skated it this season and it is maybe the best we have skated together in our career." Smart/Díaz finished in fourth place, 4.96 points ahead. With a cumulative margin of 13.33 points, Smart/Díaz were subsequently named to Spain's Olympic team.

The post-Olympic period brought about a major change in circumstances for Hurtado and Khaliavin, after Russia invaded neighbouring Ukraine and Spain and other NATO countries responded with major economic sanctions. As a result, Hurtado and the Khaliavin family relocated to Madrid indefinitely.

On May 30, Hurtado and Khaliavin announced their retirement from competitive skating. Hurtado said that they had insufficient resources to continue competing, and that she hoped they would work together to develop a skating school in Spain in the future.

Coaching career
In June 2022, Khaliavin and Hurtado began coaching the new Spanish ice dance team of Sofia Val and Alexandre Gnedin.

Programs

With Hurtado

With Monko

Competitive highlights 
GP: Grand Prix; CS: Challenger Series; JGP: Junior Grand Prix

With Hurtado for Spain

With Monko for Russia

Detailed results

Small medals for short and free programs awarded only at ISU Championships.

With Hurtado for Spain

With Monko for Russia

References

External links 

 
 
 

Russian male ice dancers
1990 births
Living people
Sportspeople from Kirov, Kirov Oblast
World Junior Figure Skating Championships medalists
Naturalised citizens of Spain
Spanish male ice dancers
Russian emigrants to Spain
Figure skaters at the 2018 Winter Olympics
Olympic figure skaters of Spain
Spanish people of Russian descent
21st-century Spanish dancers
Competitors at the 2013 Winter Universiade